The Alabama Community College Conference (ACCC) is a collegiate athletic conference and is a member of the National Junior College Athletic Association (NJCAA) and NJCAA Region 22.

Sports
Baseball
Basketball
Golf
Softball
Tennis
Volleyball

Member schools

Current members
The ACCC currently has 23 full members, all are public schools:

Notes

See also
List of NJCAA Division I schools

References

External links
Alabama Community College Conference official website

NJCAA conferences

College sports in Alabama